Kismar mountain is one of the city of Shirvan's mountains located in the Sivkanlu district.

References 

Shirvan County
Mountains of Iran
Landforms of North Khorasan Province